Philosophy in the Contemporary World is a peer-reviewed academic journal sponsored by the Society for Philosophy in the Contemporary World. The journal covers issues in applied philosophy, philosophy and public policy, race and gender studies, environmental philosophy, educational philosophy, and multiculturalism, especially when crossing disciplinary boundaries. Members of the Society for Philosophy in the Contemporary World receive the journal as a benefit of membership. All issues are available online from the Philosophy Documentation Center.

Abstracting and indexing 
Philosophy in the Contemporary World is abstracted and indexed in:

See also 
 List of philosophy journals

External links
 
 Society for Philosophy in the Contemporary World

Biannual journals
English-language journals
Philosophy journals
Publications established in 1994
Contemporary philosophical literature
Academic journals published by learned and professional societies
Philosophy Documentation Center academic journals